Mirza Ibrahimov (Azerbaijani: Mirzə İbrahimov) (15 October 1911, Eyvaq, Sarab – 17 December 1993, Baku) was a Soviet and Azerbaijani writer, playwright, state and public figure.

Mirza Ibrahimov was born in the village of Eyvaq in northwestern Iran, in the present-day Sarab County, 11 km south of Duzduzan. In 1918, he moved with his father to Baku.

His originality is from the Beyish or Bayish tribe in the village of Eyvaq, where they still live there.

As the Chairman of the Presidium of Supreme Soviet in Azerbaijan (1954-1958) he pushed hard to make Azerbaijani a second official language, in addition to Russian. He went to Moscow to speak to the Chairman of the USSR Supreme Soviet, who agreed with him, convinced that the idea made sense. In 1956, the Azerbaijan Communist Party Central Committee amended Azerbaijan's Constitution to include: (1) Azerbaijani is the State language of the Azerbaijan Republic, and (2) National minorities living in Azerbaijan shall be guaranteed the right to develop independently and use their national language in their cultural as well as state organizations.

Between 1970 and 1986 he was the Chairman of the Writers' Union of Azerbaijan.

Mirza Ibrahimov died in 1993 in Baku.

Works
 Giqantlar ölkəsi, 1932
 Həyat üçün, 1934
 Həyat (pyes), 1937
 Böyük demokrat (Molla Nəsrəddin), 1939
 Həyat və ədəbiyyat, 1947
 Azad, 1949
 Gələcək üçün, 1949
 Salam sənə Rusiya!, 1950
 Gələcək gün, 1951
 Böyük dayaq, 1957
 Mədinənin ürəyi, 1961
 Böyük şairimiz Sabir, 1962
 Murovdağın ətəyində, 1964
 Ədəbi qeydlər, 1970
 Pərvanə, 1971
 Pərvizin həyatı, 1975
 Anama deyərəm ha!, 1986

1911 births
1993 deaths
20th-century Azerbaijani dramatists and playwrights
Soviet writers
Azerbaijani writers
Azerbaijani dramatists and playwrights
Iranian emigrants to the Soviet Union
Azerbaijani people of Iranian descent
Members of the Supreme Soviet of the Azerbaijan Soviet Socialist Republic
Heroes of Socialist Labour
Stalin Prize winners
Recipients of the Order of Lenin
Recipients of the Order of the Red Banner of Labour
People from Sarab, East Azerbaijan
Burials at Alley of Honor
Honored Art Workers of the Azerbaijan SSR